Letya Sekkya was governor of Toungoo (Taungoo) from 1342 to 1344. He became governor with the title of Zeya Thingyan (ဇေယျ သင်္ကြန်) after the death of his father-in-law Kayin Ba, who left no male heirs. Prior to becoming governor, he had been a longtime minister serving at the regional court of Toungoo at least since the 1310s. In 1317−18, Sekkya led the negotiations with the forces of Pinya that allowed the rebellious governor Thawun Nge to remain in office in exchange for the latter's nominal submission. He was assassinated in 1344 by his younger brother Htauk Hlayga.

References

Bibliography
 
 

Pinya dynasty
1344 deaths